Integral membrane protein 2C is a protein that in humans is encoded by the ITM2C gene.

References

Further reading